Voronov, Voronoff, Woronoff , or Voronova (feminine; Воронова), is a common Russian surname derived from the word voron (raven). It may refer to the following notable people:

 Alexei Voronov (born 1977), Russian ice hockey player
 Anna Voronova (born 2003), Ukrainian child singer
 Avenir Voronov (1910–?), Soviet scientist and academician
 Gennady Voronov (1910–1994), Soviet statesman
 Igor Voronov (born 1965), Ukrainian businessman, historian, public figure and philanthropist
 Ivan Voronov (1915–2004), Russian actor
 Jon Woronoff (born 1938), American author, expert in Japanese economics
 Mary Woronov (born 1943), American actress and writer
 Mikhail Voronov (1840–1873), Russian writer
 Natalya Pomoshchnikova-Voronova (born 1965) Russian athlete
 Nikolay Voronov (1899–1968), Soviet military leader, Chief Marshal of Artillery
 Oktyabrina Voronova (1934–1990), Soviet poet of Sámi origin
 Sergei Voronov (disambiguation), multiple people
 Tatiana Voronova (born 1955), Russian and Latvian chess grandmaster
Yuri Voronov (disambiguation), multiple people

Russian-language surnames